W.A.K.O. World Championships 1985 may refer to:

 W.A.K.O. World Championships 1985 (Budapest)
 W.A.K.O. World Championships 1985 (London)